The programmer's key, or interrupt button, is a button or switch on Classic Mac OS-era Macintosh systems, which jumps to a machine code monitor. The symbol on the button is ⎉: . On most 68000 family based Macintosh computers, an interrupt request can also be sent by holding down the command key and pressing the power key on the keyboard. This effect is also simulated by the 68000 environment of the Mac OS nanokernel on PowerPC machines and the Classic environment.

A plastic insert came with Macintosh 128K, Macintosh 512K, Macintosh Plus, and Macintosh SE computers that could be attached to the exterior of the case and was used to press an interrupt button located on the motherboard.

Modern Mac hardware no longer includes the interrupt button, as the Mac OS X operating system has integrated debugging options. In addition, Mac OS X's protected memory blocks direct patching of system memory (in order to better secure the system).

See also
 Interrupt
 Context switch
 MacsBug

References

External links
 

Debugging
Interrupts